Cheremshan is a bandy club in Dimitrovgrad, Russia. It has been playing in the Supreme League. The home ice of the club was Stadium Stroitel in Dimitrovgrad, where artificial ice was planned in time for the 2016 Bandy World Championship., but did not happen.

References

Bandy clubs in Russia
Bandy clubs established in 1966
Sport in Dimitrovgrad, Russia